Desmond John Villiers FitzGerald, 29th Knight of Glin (13 July 1937 – 14 September 2011) was an Irish author, hereditary knight, and president of the Irish Georgian Society.

Career
The son of Desmond FitzGerald, 28th Knight of Glin (1901–1949), and Veronica Villiers (daughter of Ernest Villiers, M.P.), FitzGerald was born in Paddington, London, England into an old Hiberno-Norman aristocratic family of County Limerick and was educated at the University of British Columbia and Harvard University. He worked at the Victoria and Albert Museum in London, in the furniture department.

He later returned to Ireland, and became active in conservation issues, becoming involved with the Irish Georgian Society. He was appointed its president in 1991. He has also represented the Christie's art auctioneers in Ireland. He died in Dublin in 2011.

Family

He first married Loulou de la Falaise. In 1970, he married his second wife, Olda Ann Willes, daughter of Major Thomas and Georgina Willes. 

His three daughters are: landscape designer Catherine (who married actor Dominic West in 2010 and was previously married to Ned Lambton), Nesta, and Honor. At the time of his death, he had four grandchildren – Dora, Senan, Francis, and Rose, as well as a step-granddaughter, Martha.

Title
FitzGerald was the last Black Knight; as he had no sons and the title cannot be passed to a daughter, the title became dormant with his death. A similar title, the Knight of Kerry, is held by his distant cousins.

Glin Castle
FitzGerald divided his time between Glin Castle, Glin, County Limerick, which he inherited as a child, and his Dublin townhouse.

He devoted his life to restoring the belongings of the castle, which had been sold due to previous financial difficulties, and rebuilding and finishing the remaining parts of the estate including the Georgian house that had remained incomplete for centuries.

Ancestry

References

Sources
 Book about Desmond FitzGerald: The Last Knight: A Tribute to Desmond Fitzgerald, 29th Knight of Glin by Robert O'Byrne, Lilliput Press, September 2013;.

Publications
 FitzGerald, Desmond, and James Peill, with photography by James Fennell. The Irish Country House, New York, Vendome Press, 2010   
 FitzGerald, Desmond, and James Peill. Irish Furniture, New Haven, Yale University Press, 2007

External links
 Bibliography by Knight of Glin, amazon.ca; accessed 1 May 2016.
Desmond Fitzgerald profile, limerickcity.ie; accessed 1 May 2016.
The Knight of Glin Papers, University of Limerick, accessed 14 August 2016.

 (Ireland)

Irish knights
Desmond
1937 births
2011 deaths
Irish architectural historians
Writers from County Limerick
University of British Columbia alumni
Harvard University alumni
People associated with the Victoria and Albert Museum